This is a list of the rolling stock owned by the Ffestiniog Railway Company which is used to operate the Welsh Highland Railway

Steam locomotives

Diesel locomotives

Ffestiniog Railway locomotives used on the WHR

The following locomotives are normally Ffestiniog Railway stock that have run on the WHR.  Some have transferred for regular service, to cover for maintenance and traction requirements before there were enough dedicated WHR locomotives to operate the passenger service, others were for construction purposes only.  With the FR-WHR link now open, FR locos visit fairly regularly on special services.

Harold.
The Colonel
Upnor Castle - Construction loco, used on phase 2, 3 and 4.
Mountaineer - used in 1997 and 2000-1
Palmerston - visited in 2010 for photo-charter
Blanche - used in 1999
Conway Castle / Castell Conwy - Used on construction of phase 2 and still occasionally used for construction work.  Yard shunter at Dinas, spare passenger diesel.
Prince
Taliesin (single Fairlie locomotive) - visited in 2009 for a photo-charter
Lilla
Linda
Vale of Ffestiniog
Merddin Emrys (double Fairlie locomotive)  - visited in 2009 for a photo-charter
Lyd (Lynton and Barnstaple Railway Manning Wardle 2-6-2T Replica - visited in 2010
Earl of Merioneth (double Fairlie locomotive)
David Lloyd George (double Fairlie locomotive)
Britomart
Moelwyn

Line cars and self-propelled equipment 

 Gullick Dobson tamper
 Stefcomatic tamper
 Matisa A05 tamper
 Plasser & Theurer KMX95 CM tamper

Museum pieces 

Llanfair  built 1895 by De Winton for Penmaenmawr & Welsh Granite Co. Ltd.  gauge. Currently at Dinas awaiting tlc.

Another De Winton is on display in the entrance to the WHR Caernarfon Station.

Coaches 
The original source of information for this table was the: "Rheilffordd Eryri - Welsh Highland Railway Traveller's Guide" published by the Ffestiniog Railway Company in 2002.  This has been supplemented by later information as it became available. Updated start of season 2020.

References

External links
 NG15 No134 restoration project website

Ffestiniog Railway
Welsh Highland Railway
Welsh Highland
Welsh Highland Railway